The Perak War (1875–76) took place between British and local forces in Perak, a state in northwestern Malaysia. The sultan of Upper Perak and other local chiefs attempted to end foreign influence in the region and remove the British administrator James W. W. Birch.  Following the murder of Birch in 1875, British forces defeated local rebels and restored British control in the region.

Beginning
After the murder of James W. W. Birch, local Malays first planned on attacking Bandar Bahru on the night of November 2, but the plan was aborted due to heavy rain. British reinforcements started to arrive from Hong Kong and Burma by November 6. A skirmish happened near a Malay-held stockade near Bandar Tua, Perak on 7 November 1875 involving around 106 British soldiers. This was the first battle in the war. Encountering unexpected resistance, the battle ended with the retreat of the British detachment, who lost 4 men including Captain Innes, an officer. Reinforcements were sent, and 300 men soon arrived in the state with 80 boats. Most of the army were sent from India and Hong Kong.

Siege of Pasir Salak
On the 15th, the British army arrived at Pasir Salak. The place was well defended, with a fort that had a six-foot rampart, coupled with a wooden wall on top and with a trench filled with sharpened spikes and traps. The warriors had several lantaka with them, alongside some muskets.
The British attacked relentlessly, but the first attack failed, killing Captain Innes. Soon, the attacks gave fruit, and it was captured on 12 December. Pasir Salak was razed by the soldiers under orders from William Jervois.

Battle of Kota Lama Kanan
The warriors, under Dato Maharaja Lela, soon retreated to Sayong. The British followed them, attacking enemy forts and villages on the way. Then, on 4 January 1876, they were ambushed at Kota Lama Kanan, Sayong. Brigadier H.J. Hawkins was killed during the fight.

Last days of the war
Soon, the warriors began to lose strength. By mid-1876, the war ended with the capture of prominent leaders and warriors, such as Dato Maharaja Lela, Sultan Abdullah II and Ngah Ibrahim. The first was captured and hanged in Matang with two followers in 1877, while the latter two were exiled to the Seychelles. Thus ended any direct opposition over British control of Perak.

References 
 Swettenham, Frank Athelstane (1967), Stories and sketches. Kuala Lumpur: Oxford University Press.
 Ghulam Jie M Khan (1992), 1000 Kisah dan Fakta Raja dan Kerabat Melayu. Negeri Sembilan: Ainna's Publications

External links

 Perak War 1875–1876
 British Casualties

1875 in Asia
1876 in Asia
19th-century military history of the United Kingdom
Conflicts in 1875
Conflicts in 1876
History of Perak
Wars involving pre-independence Malaysia
Wars involving the United Kingdom